Tales From The Ether is a 1989 role-playing game adventure for Space: 1889 published by Game Designers' Workshop.

Plot summary
Tales From The Ether is an adventure in which containing five scenarios featuring locations on the Moon, Mercury, Venus, Mars, and the orbiting British Heliograph the Harbinger.

Publication history
Tales From The Ether was written by Frank Chadwick with Marc W. Miller, Loren K. Wiseman, Tim Ryan, and Lester W. Smith, with a cover by David R. Deitrick, and was published by Game Designers' Workshop in 1989 as a 64-page book.

Reception
Paul Mason reviewed Tales From The Ether for Games International magazine, and gave it 2 stars out of 5, and stated that "Tales from the Ether is a standing still product. It will satisfy those who were sold on the Space: 1889 concept but who lack the imagination to design their own adventures. What it doesn't do is add anything truly creative to the game, or provide much in the way of inspiration for more imaginative referees. Still, it's good value for money."

References

Role-playing game supplements introduced in 1989
Science fiction role-playing game adventures
Space: 1889